is a Japanese footballer who currently plays in for Estudiantes Tecos as a midfielder. He is the first Japanese to play a match for a team in the top Mexican league. He has played for the U-14, U-16, and U-17 Japanese national teams.

References

External links
Reiji Sato at playmakerstats.com (formerly thefinalball.com)
jfa.or.jp
asianfootballfeast.com

1993 births
Living people
Association football midfielders
Japanese footballers
Liga MX players
Atlético Morelia players